Massachusetts elected its members November 1, 1824. Massachusetts had a majority requirement for election, which necessitated additional elections held January 3, 1825, April 1, 1825, and August 1, 1825.

See also 
 1824 Massachusetts's 10th congressional district special election
 1824 and 1825 United States House of Representatives elections
 List of United States representatives from Massachusetts

Notes 

1824
Massachusetts
Massachusetts
United States House of Representatives
United States House of Representatives